The 2020–21 Notre Dame Fighting Irish men's basketball team represented the University of Notre Dame during the 2020–21 NCAA Division I men's basketball season. The Fighting Irish were led by 21st-year head coach Mike Brey and played their home games at the Purcell Pavilion in Notre Dame, Indiana as eight-year members of the Atlantic Coast Conference.

The Fighting Irish finished the season 11–15, 7–11 in ACC play, to finish in eleventh place.  In the ACC tournament they defeated Wake Forest before losing to North Carolina in the second round.  They were not invited to either the NCAA tournament or NIT.

Previous season
The Fighting Irish finished the 2019–20 season 20–12, 10–10 in ACC play to finish in a tie for eight place. As the No. 7 seed in the ACC tournament, they defeated Boston College in the second round.  The team was scheduled to play Virginia in the quarterfinals of the ACC tournament before the tournament was cancelled due to the COVID-19 pandemic.  The NCAA tournament and NIT were also cancelled due to the pandemic.

Offseason

Departures

Incoming transfers

2020 recruiting class

Roster

Schedule and results

Source:

|-
!colspan=12 style=| Regular season

|-
!colspan=12 style=| ACC tournament

Rankings

*AP does not release post-NCAA Tournament rankings

References

Notre Dame Fighting Irish men's basketball seasons
Notre Dame
Notre Dame Fighting Irish men's basketball